Wyoming Apartments is a historic apartment building, located at 2022 Columbia Road, Northwest, Washington, D.C. in the Kalorama neighborhood.

History
The Beaux-Arts luxury apartment building was designed by B. Stanley Simmons, for Lester A. Barr.  The building has two wings: The first was built in 1905, and the second wing was constructed in 1911. In 1982, Barr's grandson sold the building for $6.3 million to developers, who converted it to condominiums.

The building is composed of 106 apartments, 76 in the South Wing and 30 in the North Wing.

Featured in book, The Lost Child of Philomena Lee, as the weekday residence of her son, who worked for the Republican National Committee, and his partner.

The Wyoming is listed on the National Register of Historic Places, and is a contributing property to the Washington Heights Historic District.

Notable Residents

Former 
 Betty Friedan 
 Christopher Hitchens
 Dwight D. Eisenhower
 George Stephanopoulos

See also
 National Register of Historic Places listings in Washington, D.C.

References

External links
 

Residential buildings completed in 1905
Residential buildings completed in 1911
Apartment buildings in Washington, D.C.
Residential buildings on the National Register of Historic Places in Washington, D.C.
Beaux-Arts architecture in Washington, D.C.
Historic district contributing properties in Washington, D.C.
1905 establishments in Washington, D.C.